Brian Eric Reith (born February 28, 1978) is a former professional baseball pitcher.

Career
He was drafted by the New York Yankees in the 6th round of the 1996 Major League Baseball Draft. He was traded with Drew Henson, Jackson Melián, and Ed Yarnall for Denny Neagle and Mike Frank. Reith made his Major League debut playing for the Cincinnati Reds in 2001.

In 2007, Reith played for the Somerset Patriots in the independent Atlantic League. In 8 games, he was 2–3 with a 2.70 ERA before signing with the Uni-President Lions in the CPBL. Again with Somerset in 2008, he started 8 games before eventually becoming the closer. Reith went 5–4 with a 3.94 ERA and 16 saves during the season.

In December 2008, Reith signed a minor league contract with the Milwaukee Brewers, but was released before the 2009 season's start. He split the 2009 season between the Tigres de Quintana Roo of the Mexican League and two independent teams, the Joliet JackHammers of the Northern League and the Camden Riversharks of the Atlantic League.

Reith currently serves as the pitching coach for the Bowling Green Hot Rods.

References

External links
, or CPBL

1978 births
Living people
American expatriate baseball players in Mexico
American expatriate baseball players in Taiwan
Baseball coaches from Indiana
Baseball players from Fort Wayne, Indiana
Camden Riversharks players
Chattanooga Lookouts players
Cincinnati Reds players
Dayton Dragons players
Greensboro Bats players
Gulf Coast Yankees players
Indianapolis Indians players
Joliet JackHammers players
Louisville Bats players
Louisville RiverBats players
Major League Baseball pitchers
Mexican League baseball pitchers
Minor league baseball coaches
Scranton/Wilkes-Barre Red Barons players
Somerset Patriots players
Sportspeople from Fort Wayne, Indiana
Tampa Yankees players
Tigres de Quintana Roo players
Uni-President Lions players
Yaquis de Obregón players